"The Best of Me" is a song by American singer Mýa. It served as Harrison's first single from her second studio album Fear of Flying (2000) and featured Yonkers rapper Jadakiss. The song was written and composed by the latter and Harrison along with Teron Beal, Jimmy Cozier, Swizz Beatz and Mashonda Tifrere. Lyrically, "The Best of Me," a street savvy anthem addresses a woman holding off being intimate or physical with a guy.

The song received generally positive reviews from contemporary music critics. However, "The Best of Me" underperformed on Billboards US Hot 100; peaking and spending two non-consecutive weeks at number fifty. It fared better on the component Hot R&B/Hip-Hop Singles & Tracks chart peaking within the top 20 at number fourteen. Internationally, the song peaked within the top 40 in Germany, peaking at number twenty-six. The song was sent to radio stations on April 11, 2000 and the accompanying music video was serviced to video outlets  a month prior on March 6, 2000. Her love interest was portrayed by Sisqó's cousin.

Background and release
"The Best of Me" was composed by Mýa Harrison and Swizz Beatz, along with singers Teron Beal, Jimmy Cozier, Mashonda, and rapper Jadakiss, the latter of which is also featured vocally on the song. Originally expected to be recorded by rapper DMX in a Miami recording session with Swizz, the instrumental of the song was left unused until the producer returned to New York City to start work on Harrison's album at The Hit Factory. Upon accidentally pushing a button in the studio, Harrison's management reportedly "jumped up and said 'That's it, that's it'." When recording "The Best of Me" producer Swizz Beatz admired Harrison's work ethic, commenting, she's as dedicated to mastering vocals as she is to dance. He noted, "She takes everything seriously when it comes to the music citing "she's a perfectionist." However, Harrison clarified, "I'm not a perfectionist but I like to improve." An eleventh hour addition, the record was among the last tracks that were recorded for the Fear of Flying album. Jadakiss, then a member of the Ruff Ryders Entertainment's group The LOX, came aboard as a result of label connections with Interscope Records.

Speaking on the message of the uptempo track with "a lot of meanings," Harrison explained: "[It] talks about thinking about consequences before you make a decision, especially decisions made when you're in a situation of the heat of the moment," she said, "when passion and infatuation and seduction and all these things are taking place, and you're actually liking it. However, as a female, things do happen to you that you must carry on after the fact, so you're trying to weigh the consequences and make a decision based on what you know, and you may not know much about this person. It's just about setting standards for yourself and what you want." Before "The Best of Me" was chosen as the lead single from Fear of Flying, Harrison initially expected reggae-influenced "Lie Detector" to be released as her next single.

Critical reception
Upon its release, "The Best of Me" received generally favorable reviews from contemporary music critics. While reviewing Fear of Flying, All Music's Jose F. Promis praised "The Best of Me" highlighting "The Best of Me" as arguably the best song on the album while noting it as "one of the better pop songs of 2000." Billboard magazine called "The Best of Me" a "dreamy midtempo tune." "The Best of Me" was featured on The Village Voices Pazz & Jop end of the year critics list.

Commercial performance
In the United States, The Best of Me made its debut at number eighty-five on Billboard Hot 100 issue dated week of April 15, 2000. It reached its peak at number fifty issue dated week of May 20, 2000. In total, the song spent 17 consecutive weeks on the chart. It was Harrison's first single to miss the coveted pop Top 40. The Best of Me performed better on Hot R&B/Hip-Hop Singles & Tracks chart debuting at number seventy issue dated week of April 1, 2000. It ascended from 70-40 in its second week issue dated week of April 8, 2000. The song continued to soar up the chart ascending from 40-27 issue dated week of April 15, 2000.  It reached its peak at number fourteen issue dated week of May 20, 2000. It became Harrison's fourth consecutive Top 40 (solo) sixth overall hit on that chart.

The Best of Me crossed-over onto international markets. In Netherlands, it debuted and peaked at number seventy-five during the week of August 29, 2001. It debuted and peaked at number sixty-four during the week of July 23, 2000 on Switzerland's Top 75 Singles chart. It spent a total of 8 consecutive weeks on that chart. It reached the Top 40 in Germany; peaking at number twenty-six.

Music video
A music video for "The Best of Me" was directed by Chris Robinson. The clip starts with Mýa practicing a dance routine to an instrumental version of DMX's "Good Girls, Bad Guys" (1999) alongside two female dancers in a dance studio. Next to Jadakiss, Styles P and Sheek Louch from his group The Lox co-star, with actress LaNease Adams and entertainer Christina Milian also appearing in the clip, portraying Mýa's friends. The video was serviced to video outlets on March 6, 2000 before a commercial release date was determined. and premiered four days later on MTV's countdown show TRL.

Legacy
Atlanta rapper Father recorded and released a cover version of "The Best of Me."

Track listings

{{Track listing
| headline        = US 12" single| extra_column    = Producer(s)

| title1  = The Best of Me
| note1   = Main Vs.
| writer1 = 
| extra1  = Swizz Beatz
| length1 = 4:20

| title2  = The Best of Me
| note2   = Instrumental
| writer2 = 
| extra2  = Swizz Beatz
| length2 = 4:19

| title3  = The Best of Me
| note3   = Accapella
| writer3 = 
| extra3  = Swizz Beatz
| length3 = 4:19

| title4  = The Best of Me
| note4   = Main Vs.
| writer4 = 
| extra4  = Swizz Beatz
| length4 = 4:20

| title5  = The Best of Me
| note5   = Instrumental
| writer5 = 
| extra5  = Swizz Beatz
| length5 = 4:19

| title6  = The Best of Me
| note6   = Accapella
| writer6 = 
| extra6  = Swizz Beatz
| length6 = 4:19
}}Notes' denotes remix producer

Credits and personnel
Credits lifted from the liner notes of Fear of Flying''.

 

Teron Beal – additional vocal producer, writer
Jimmy Cozier – additional vocal producer, writer
Kevin Crouse – recording engineer
Swizz Beatz – producer, writer
Mýa Harrison – vocals, writer

Tony Maserati – mixing engineer
Jason "Jadakiss" Phillips – writer
Mashonda Tifrere – writer
Kiran Wagner – recording engineer

Charts

Weekly charts

Year-end charts

Release history

References

2000 singles
Jadakiss songs
Music videos directed by Chris Robinson (director)
Mýa songs
Song recordings produced by Swizz Beatz
Songs written by Swizz Beatz
Songs written by Jadakiss
Songs written by Mýa
2000 songs
Songs written by Jimmy Cozier
Interscope Records singles
Songs written by Teron Beal